Sreten Ćuk (born 1 August 1963) is a Croatian footballer and later football manager.

Managerial career
He was appointed manager of Lokomotiva in 2015, replacing Ante Čačić. He then took charge of Karlovac in September 2020 and in June 2022 he took charge of the Croatia national under-15 football team.

References

1963 births
Living people
Footballers from Zagreb
Association football midfielders
Yugoslav footballers
GNK Dinamo Zagreb players
Croatian football managers
GNK Dinamo Zagreb managers
HNK Gorica managers
NK Sesvete managers
NK Lokomotiva Zagreb managers
NK Karlovac managers
Croatian Football League managers
GNK Dinamo Zagreb non-playing staff
Persepolis F.C. non-playing staff
Croatian expatriate sportspeople in Iran